Bud Bud is a census town in Galsi I CD Block of Bardhaman Sadar North subdivision of Purba Bardhaman district in the Indian state of West Bengal.

Geography

Location

Bud Bud is located on NH 19 (formerly known as Grand Trunk Road) in the laterite plains between Damodar River and Ajay River. Khari or Khargeswari River flows through the area. It is believed that the river was earlier linked with Damodar.

It is close to Mankar railway station and a place surrounded with rice processing mills.

Urbanisation
73.58% of the population of Bardhaman Sadar North subdivision live in the rural areas. Only 26.42% of the population live in the urban areas, and that is the highest proportion of urban population amongst the four subdivisions in Purba Bardhaman district. The map alongside presents some of the notable locations in the subdivision. All places marked in the map are linked in the larger full screen map.

Gram panchayats
Gram panchayats under Galsi I Panchayat Samiti (in Bardhaman Sadar North subdivision) are: Chaktentul, Budbud, Mankar, Lowapur-Krishnarampur, Serorai and Uchagram.

Police station
Bud Bud police station has jurisdiction over parts of Galsi I and Ausgram II CD Blocks. The area covered is 139.7 km.2

CD Block HQ
The headquarters of Galsi I CD Block are located at Bud Bud.

Demographics
As per 2011 Census of India Bud Bud had a total population of 4,558 of which 2,334 (51%) were males and 2,224 (49%) were females. Population below 6 years was 410. The total number of literates in Bud Bud was 3,348 (80.71% of the population over 6 years).

Infrastructure
As per the District Census Handbook 2011, Bud Bud covered an area of 3.9631 km2. It had 15 km roads. Amongst the medical facilities, the nearest nursing home was 3 km away and the nearest veterinary hospital was 3 km away. It had 4 medicine shops. Amongst the educational facilities it had was 3 primary schools, 2 middle schools, 2 secondary schools and 2 senior secondary schools. The nearest degree college was at Mankar 6 km away.

Transport
It is located on Grand Trunk Road, and is near Mankar railway station on the Bardhaman-Durgapur stretch of the Howrah-Delhi track. The office of the Block Development Officer of Galsi I block covering areas of Galsi and Bud Bud police stations is located at Bud Bud.

SH 14, running from Dubrajpur (in Birbhum district) to Betai (in Nadia district), passes through Bud Bud.

Culture
Shridhara Temple, temple of goddess Durga is well known in the area.

Health 
.

See also 
 List of reduplicated place names
Budbud -its history and culture

References

External links 
 Villages in Bardhaman District
 Map of Bardhaman district

Cities and towns in Purba Bardhaman district